

The Lockheed Air Express was the second aircraft design created by the Lockheed Aircraft Company after its founding in 1927; the type first flew in April 1928.

Description 
The Air Express design incorporated the original fuselage of the Vega, but in order to meet the requirements of Western Air Express, the wing was raised to a parasol configuration above the fuselage and the cockpit was moved behind the wing, while a more powerful Pratt & Whitney Wasp engine was fitted to ease operations over the Sierra Nevada mountains. The design was a commercial success for the company although only seven were built, plus one Air Express Special.

No Air Expresses have survived to the present day. One, registered NR3057, was flown by Roscoe Turner.

Variants 
Lockheed 3 Air Express Single-engined passenger and mail transport aircraft, seating between four and six passengers in an enclosed cabin, able to carry up to 1,000-lb (454-kg) of mail, powered by a 410-hp (306-kW) Pratt & Whitney Wasp radial piston engine; seven built.
Air Express Special One-off version built for Laura Ingalls, for a non-stop trans-Atlantic flight in 1931; one built.

Operators 

Panair do Brasil

American Airways
New York, Rio, and Buenos Aires Line
Pan American Airways
 Texas Air Transport
Western Air Express

Specifications

See also

References 

Notes

Bibliography
 Francillon, René J. Lockheed Aircraft since 1913. London:Putnam, First edition, 1982. .
 Francillon, René J, Lockheed Aircraft since 1913. Naval Institute Press: Annapolis, 1987.

Air Express
1920s United States airliners
Single-engined tractor aircraft
Parasol-wing aircraft
Aircraft first flown in 1928